Tremaine Weston Johnson (born September 26, 1985) is an American former gridiron football defensive tackle who played in the National Football League (NFL) and Canadian Football League (CFL). He was signed as an undrafted free agent by the Minnesota Vikings of the National Football League in 2009. Johnson played college football at LSU.

References

1985 births
Living people
American football defensive tackles
American players of Canadian football
Georgia Force players
LSU Tigers football players
Minnesota Vikings players
Montreal Alouettes players
Tampa Bay Storm players
Players of American football from Houston